This is a list of musical works by the French composer Georges Bizet (1838–1875).

List of works

Stage works
Operas:

 La maison du docteur (The Physician's House), opéra comique, 1 act, (H. Boisseaux; composed either in 1867 or 1859; unperformed)
 Le docteur Miracle (Doctor Miracle, opérette, 1 act, (L. Battu & L. Halévy, after R.B. Sheridan; composed 1856; first performance: Paris, Bouffes-Parisiens, 9 April 1857)
 Don Procopio, opéra bouffe, 2 acts, (C. Cambiaggio, after L. Prividali; composed 1858–59; first performance: Monte Carlo, 10 March 1906)
 La prêtresse (The Priestess), opérette, 1 act, (P. Gille; composed ca. 1861; unperformed)
 La guzla de l'émir (The Guzla of the Amir), opéra comique, (J. Barbier & M. Carré; composed ca. 1862; unperformed)
 Ivan IV, opéra, 5 acts, (F.-H. Leroy & H. Trianon; composed ca. 1862–65; first performance: Württemberg, Mühringen Castle, 1946)
 Les pêcheurs de perles (The Pearl Fishers), opéra, 3 acts, (E. Cormon & M. Carré; composed 1863; first performance: Paris, Théâtre Lyrique, 30 September 1863)
 La jolie fille de Perth (The Fair Maid of Perth), opéra, 4 acts, (J.-H. Vernoy de Saint-Georges & J. Adenis, after W. Scott); composed 1866; first performance: Paris, Théâtre Lyrique, 26 December 1867)
 Marlbrough s'en va-t-en guerre (Marlbrough Goes to War), opérette, 4 acts, (P. Siraudin & W. Busnach; composed 1867, Act I only, lost; first performance: Paris, Théâtre de l'Athénée, 13 December 1867; the title was taken from the popular song "Marlbrough s'en va-t-en guerre")
 La coupe du roi de Thulé (The Cup of the King of Thule), opéra, 3 acts, (L. Gallet & E. Blau; composed 1868–69, after his death the autograph full score was mutilated by various hands and only fragments remain; first performance: (excerpts) BBC Radio, 12 July 1955)
 Clarisse Harlowe, opéra comique, 3 acts, (Gille & A. Jaime, after S. Richardson; composed 1870–71, incomplete; unperformed)
 Grisélidis, opéra comique, 1 act, (V. Sardou; composed 1870–71, incomplete; unperformed)
 Djamileh, opéra comique, 1 act, (Gallet, after A. de Musset; composed 1871; first performance: Paris, Opéra-Comique (Favart), 22 May 1872)
 Don Rodrigue, opéra, 5 acts, (Gallet & Blau, after G. de Castro y Bellvis; composed 1872, incomplete draft; unperformed)
 Carmen, opéra, 4 acts, (H. Meilhac & L. Halévy, after P. Mérimée; composed 1873–74; first performance: Paris, Opéra-Comique (Favart), 3 March 1875)

Incidental music:
 L'Arlésienne (The Girl from Arles), incidental music, 3 acts (A. Daudet; composed 1872; first performance: Paris, Théâtre Vaudeville, 1 October 1872)

Orchestral works
 Overture in A, 1855
 Symphony in C major, 1855
 Roma Symphony, 1866/1868
 Petite suite (five movements orchestrated from Jeux d'enfants)
 Overture Patrie, 1872
 He compiled an orchestral suite using some pieces from his incidental music for L'Arlesienne; after his death, Ernest Guiraud put together a second L'Arlésienne suite, although it also included music from La jolie fille de Perth

Works for chorus and orchestra
 Clovis et Clotilde (cantata), 1857
 Te Deum, 1858
 Ode Symphony Vasco de Gama, 1859–60

Songs
(words by / year composed)
 L'âme triste est pareille au doux ciel (Lamartine)
 Petite Marguerite (Olivier Rolland, 1854)
 La rose et l'abeille (Rolland, 1854)
 La foi, l'esperance et la charité (de Lagrave, 1854))
 Vieille chanson (Millevoye, 1865)
 Adieux de l'hôtesse arabe (Hugo, 1866)
 Apres l'hiver (Hugo, 1866)
 Douce mer (Lamartine, 1866)
 Chanson d'avril (Bouilhet, 1866)
 Feuilles d'album (1866): "À une fleur" (de Musset), "Adieux à Suzon" (de Musset), "Sonnet" (Ronsard), "Guitare" (Hugo), "Rose d'amour" (Millevoye), "Le grillon" (Lamartine)
 Pastorale (Regnard, 1868)
 Rêve de la bien-aimée (de Courmont, 1868; dedicated to Léontine de Maësen)
 Ma vie a son secret (Arvers, 1868)
 Berceuse (Desbordes-Valmore, 1868)
 La chanson du fou (Hugo, 1868)
 La coccinelle (Hugo, 1868)
 La sirène (Mendès, 1868)
 Le doute (Ferrier, 1868)
 L'esprit saint
 Absence (Gautier)
 Chant d'amour (Lamartine)
 Tarentelle (Pailleron)
 Vous ne priez pas (Casamir Delavigne)
 Le colibri (Flan, 1868)
 Sérénade 'Oh, quand je dors' (Hugo)
 Vœu (Hugo, 1868)
 Voyage, Aubade, La nuit, Conte, Aimons, rêvons!, La chanson de la rose, Le Gascon, N'oublions pas!, Si vous aimez!, Pastel, l'abandonnée (these songs are from unidentified unfinished dramatic works)

Works for piano
 Nocturne in F major
 Variations chromatiques de concert (Chromatic Variations in Concert; orchestrated by Felix Weingartner in 1933)
 Caprice in C minor
 Caprice in C major
 Chasse fantastique (The Fantastic Hunt)
 Romance sans paroles (Romance Without Words) in C major
 Thème brilliant in C
 Valse in C major
 Trois esquisses musicales (Three Musical Sketches)
 Grande valse de concert in E
 Marine
 Nocturne in D major
 Four Impromptus
 Impromptu no. 1, Allegro Modertato in F Minor
 Impromptu no. 2, Allegretto in A-Flat Major
 Impromptu no. 3, Andante (Theme with variants) in B-Flat Major
 Impromptu no. 4, Allegro Scherzando in F Minor
 Chants du Rhin (Songs of the Rhine)
 Four préludes
Chansons-Mélodies Romances sans Paroles: Chanson d'Avril, Extase, Méditation : Souvenir de l'Arlésienne
Venise : Romance sans Paroles
 Jeux d'enfants (Children's Games) 12 pieces for piano duet
 L'escarpolette (The Swing, Rêverie)
 La toupie (The Top, Impromptu)
 La poupée (The Doll, Berceuse)
 Les chevaux de bois (The Hobby-horses, Scherzo)
 Le volant (Battledore and Shuttlecock, Fantasy)
 Trompette et tambour (Trumpet and Drum, March)
 Les bulles de savon (Soap Bubbles, Rondo)
 Les quatre coins (Puss in the Corner, Esquisse)
 Colin-maillard (Blind Man's Bluff, Nocturne)
 Saute-mouton (Leap-frog, Caprice)
 Petit mari, petite femme (Little Husband, little wife, Duo)
 Le bal (The Ball, Gallop)

Transcriptions
 Version for solo piano of all three movements of Saint-Saëns' Piano Concerto No. 2

Completions of others' works
 Fromental Halévy – Noé, opéra, 3 acts (Saint-Georges; composed 1858–62 and left unfinished at Halévy's death; completed by Bizet; first performance Karlsruhe, 5 April 1885)

References
Notes

Sources
 Sadie, Stanley, ed. (1992). The New Grove Dictionary of Opera (4 volumes). London: Macmillan. .
 Dean, Winton (1978). Bizet (The Master Musician Series, 3rd edition). London: J. M. Dent. .

External links
 

 
Bizet